Speedball may refer to:

Games
Speedball (paintball), a paintball game variant
Speedball (video game), a 1988 video game by Bitmap Brothers

Music
"Speedball", a song by Black Label Society from 1919 Eternal
"Speedball", jazz composition by Lee Morgan, originally appearing on The Gigolo and later on Live at the Lighthouse
"Speedball", a song by John Zorn from Naked City

Sports
Speedball (American ball game), a combination of handball and soccer
Speed-ball, an Egyptian racquet sport
Speedball (boxing), a small punching bag used by boxers for training

Other
Speedball (drug), a mix of heroin and cocaine, or similar drugs
Speedball (art products), an American art products manufacturer
Robbie Baldwin, a Marvel Comics superhero known as "Speedball", formerly known as Penance
"Speedball", a name for the mixed drink Vodka Red Bull